Bowling Green Historic District is a national historic district located at Bowling Green, Caroline County, Virginia. The district encompasses 169 contributing buildings, 1 contributing site, and 1 contributing structure in  the historic core of Bowling Green. Notable properties include the Rains House (1737), A. B. Chandler, Sr. House (late 1800s), Bowling Green United Methodist Church, Shiloh Baptist Church (1895), Antioch Christian Church (c. 1920), Union Bank and Trust Company (1912), Bowling Green Baptist Church (1898), Caroline County Clerk's Office (1907), Bowling Green Town Hall (early 1940s), “Glasselton” (1846), and the site of the New Hope Tavern and Lawn Hotel. The Caroline County Courthouse and the “Old Mansion” are separately listed.

It was listed on the National Register of Historic Places in 2003.

References

Historic districts in Caroline County, Virginia
National Register of Historic Places in Caroline County, Virginia
Historic districts on the National Register of Historic Places in Virginia